The 138th Infantry Regiment is an infantry regiment of the United States Army and the Missouri National Guard headquartered in Kansas City, Missouri. Of the original regiment, only the 1st Battalion remains an active National Guard unit. As of 2018, the 1st Battalion, 138th Infantry Regiment is a light infantry battalion currently assigned to the 39th Infantry Brigade Combat Team. As of 2022, the 3rd Battalion, 138th Infantry Regiment is a light infantry battalion currently assigned to 72nd Infantry Brigade Combat Team (United States).

History
The 138th Infantry Regiment traces its lineage from the St. Louis Greys, a volunteer militia company organized in 1832 and the first militia regiment of Missouri.  The company's first combat action was during the Mexican War while serving with the St. Louis Legion, a battalion-sized element composed of independent St. Louis-area companies. The unit mustered into federal service on 18 May 1846 along with the Native American Rangers, Boone Guards, Montgomery Guards, Missouri Fusiliers and Riflemen, Morgan Riflemen, and the Texas Free Corps.  By 1853 the Greys expanded to five companies to form the 1st Battalion, 1st Missouri Regiment but underwent a series of reductions until 1857 when all but one company of Greys remained.

During the Missouri-Kansas border crises in 1860, the First Missouri Infantry Regiment (of which the Greys were a part along with several other St. Louis area militia companies), patrolled the border to prevent Free-Stater settlers from entering the state, an action called the Southwest Expedition.

Civil War
Many of the Greys ignored President Lincoln's issued proclamation for the states to call up their militia and provide troops to the Federal Government to suppress the Rebellion after the bombardment of Fort Sumter, and mustered into service at the call of Governor Jackson, outside of St. Louis at Camp Jackson where St. Louis University now sits.  Accused of plotting to capture the St. Louis Arsenal as part of the Camp Jackson Affair, now the location of the Budweiser Brewery, the 1st Missouri Volunteer Militia, with its two companies of St. Louis Greys, were captured by Union troops and marched to the arsenal.  Upon being paroled, the Greys and the remainder of the old First Missouri broke their parole and were reformed into the Missouri State Guard. They then went to Memphis, Tennessee and created a Confederate regiment known as the 1st Missouri Infantry Regiment, 1st Missouri Brigade, otherwise known as the “Camp Jackson Boys” and was commanded by Col. John S. Bowen.  With casualties came amalgamation, and after fighting in the Shiloh, Mississippi River, Vicksburg, Atlanta, Nashville, Mississippi, Louisiana, and Alabama campaigns, the 1st Missouri surrendered at Fort Blakely, Alabama on 9 April 1865.  The 1st Missouri Infantry Regiment marched on foot more than 4,000 miles and traveled more than 1,500 miles by railroad and streamboat during their 40-month journey across seven states on both sides of the Mississippi.  It was also a part of the best drilled and finest combat unit of the Confederate States Army and one of the most elite units in the entire Civil War, the 1st Missouri Brigade "the South's Finest".

Below is a quote from the company commander of Company "D": St. Louis Greys that served during the Civil War regarding the First Missouri Infantry:

 

After the Civil War, the Greys reformed and by 1873 joined other uniformed companies to create the 1st Regiment of Organized Missouri Militia.  In 1898 nearly every member of the First Regiment, Missouri National Guard, as it was known at that time, volunteered to fight in the war with Spain under the name of the First Regiment of Infantry, Missouri Volunteers.  They mustered into service at Jefferson Barracks and mobilized to Chickamauga Park, Georgia on 21 May 1898 but were never sent to Cuba or Puerto Rico due to lack of funding from the state.

The Militia Act of 1903 required the National Guard of Missouri to conform to federal regulations and with the initiation of the National Defense Act of 1916, the First Missouri took an oath to the President of the United States as well as to the Governor of Missouri.  After taking part in the Punitive Expedition in 1916 with service in Loredo, Texas, the 1st Missouri returned home.  However, it was a short stay.  Ordered to Camp Doniphan, now part of Ft. Sill, Oklahoma, the regiment began training for the Great War.  On 1 October 1917, the First and Fifth Regiments, both from St. Louis, were consolidated into the 138th Infantry Regiment, 69th Brigade, 35th Infantry Division.

World War I
During World War I, the 138th Infantry Regiment first took over operations in the Vosges Mountains in southern France and drew first blood for the 35th Infantry Division during a trench raid at Hilsenfirst.  The regiment later took part in the Battle of St. Mihiel.  In the Battle of the Meuse-Argonne, the regiment led the division on the first day of the attack on 26 September 1918.  During this engagement, Private Nels Wald and Captain Alexander Skinker earned the Medal of Honor.  Fighting through fog, enfilade fire from their left flank, and under constant artillery barrages, the regiment toiled through an exposed sector, German machine gun nests, and sniper fire to complete its objective on Vauquois Hill. The regiment fought alongside Colonel George S. Patton's tank brigade to capture the villages of Cheppy and Exermont.  After the Meuse-Argonne, the 138th assumed occupation duty south of Verdun.

Interwar period

After the war's end, the regiment was demobilized on 12 May 1919 at Camp Grant, Illinois.  The 138th Infantry was reconstituted in the National Guard in 1921, assigned to the 35th Division, and allotted to the state of Missouri.  The 1st Infantry, Missouri National Guard, was reorganized in 1921 with the headquarters, auxiliary troops, and 1st and 2nd Battalions in St. Louis and the 3rd Battalion in eastern Missouri. The 138th Infantry was reorganized on 1 October 1921 by the redesignation of the 1st Infantry.  On 8 July 1922, the U.S. Army approved the 138th's Regimental coat of arms along with the regimental colors.  The coat of arms is an infantry blue shield with the Apotheosis of St. Louis in profile. The regiment's motto, "St. Louis’ Own" alludes to the historical home of the regiment and serves as a recognition if its history – nearly all the original members of the regiment were St. Louisans as were its Medal of Honor recipients.  The regiment's official designation as the "First Missouri" also stands as testament to its former name – Missouri's first, and now only, infantry regiment.

World War II
During World War II, the 138th Infantry was detached from the 35th Infantry Division on 1 March 1942, and served in the Aleutian Islands from May 1942 to June 1944, assisting in construction projects, defending bases and manning outposts. The regiment was inactivated at Camp Shelby, Mississippi, on 20 July 1944. After 1945 the regiment returned once again to St. Louis but by 1963 only the 1st Battalion remained in service.  1 May 1974 was the first day that an infantry unit could not call St. Louis and the State of Missouri home, as it had for 142 years.  On that day, the lineage and honors of the regiment passed to the 1138th Engineer Battalion and was held by units in St. Louis, including Company B, 1st Battalion, 138th Infantry Regiment, until reclaimed by the entire battalion in 2014 when the U.S. Army and National Guard Bureau recognized the 138th once again in the U.S. Army Regimental System.

Global War on Terrorism

The reactivation of 1st Battalion, 138th Infantry Regiment (1-138th) began on 1 September 2010, with early implementation of the modified table of organization and equipment occurring on 1 September 2009.  The 1-138th Infantry is the first infantry unit allocated to the Missouri National Guard since the casing of the 138th regimental colors in 1974.  The 1-138th Infantry began building, forming, and equipping actions on 1 September 2008 with Federal Recognition granted in January 2012.  In a Ceremony on 17 June 2015 at Ft. Chaffee, Arkansas, the Soldiers of the 1-138th Infantry witnessed the uncasing of its regimental colors since their last casing over 30 years earlier – a poetic gesture, as the regiment's forbearers fought valiantly as brother's in arm with Arkansas over 150 years before.

First Missouri citizen soldiers deployed to conduct State Emergency Duty during the winter storms of 2010 and most recently, to protect persons, property, and civil liberties in Ferguson, Missouri in 2014.

The battalion deployed to Qatar in 2017 in support of Operation Enduring Freedom (Spartan Shield) to provide force protection of U.S. military assets and was there during the turbulent beginning of the GCC-Qatar Crisis. The battalion conducted security operations and was tasked with Quick Reaction Force responsibilities at various outposts in the region.

The reactivation of 3rd Battalion, 138th Infantry Regiment (3-138th) began on 1 September 2023, with early implementation of the modified table of organization and equipment occurring on 1 September 2022.

Command Teams
1st Battalion, Battalion Commanders
LTC Kevin Fujimoto (2008-2011)
LTC Levon Cumpton (2011-2013)
LTC Martin Clay (2013-2015)
LTC Douglas McConnell (2015-2018)
LTC Tom Pickle (2018-2020)
LTC Peter J. McCann (2020-Current)

3rd Battalion, Battalion Commanders
LTC Tyson K Erdman (2022-Current

1st Battalion, Battalion Command Sergeants Major
CSM Scott Kennedy (2008-2009)
CSM Larry Godsey (2009-2018)
CSM Don Lilleman (2018-2021)
CSM Wes Blanscet (2021-2022)
CSM Eric Jordan (2022-Current)

3rd Battalion, Battalion Command Sergeants Major
CSM Wes Blanscet (2022-Current)

Notable Members of the Regiment
 Captain Alexander R. Skinker, Medal of Honor, WWI
 Private Nels Wold, Medal of Honor, WWI
 Sgt. Frank P. Zeisler, Purple Heart, WWI

Lineage
Organized in 1832 in the Missouri Militia at St. Louis as the St. Louis Greys
 Consolidated in 1843 with existing units in St. Louis to form the Regiment of St. Louis Militia
 Mustered into federal service 18 May 1846 at St. Louis as the St. Louis Legion; mustered out of federal service 25 August 1846 at St. Louis
 Reorganized as Easton's Battalion of Infantry and mustered into federal service 10–24 May 1847 at St. Louis
 Mustered out of federal service 9–10 October 1848 at St. Louis; battalion (less St. Louis Greys) concurrently disbanded
 St. Louis Greys consolidated in 1852 with existing companies in St. Louis to form the 1st Missouri Infantry Regiment
 1st Missouri Infantry Regiment captured by Union Forces 10 May 1861 at Camp Jackson, Missouri
 Elements of former 1st Missouri Infantry Regiment consolidated 22 June 1861 with elements of former 2d Missouri Infantry Regiment (organized in February 1861 at St. Louis; captured by Union forces 10 May 1861 at Camp Jackson, Missouri) and consolidated elements reorganized in Confederate service at Memphis, Tennessee in September 1861, as the 1st Missouri Infantry Regiment, 1st Missouri Brigade
 Consolidated 1 November 1862 with the 4th Missouri Infantry Regiment (organized 30 April 1862 in Confederate service near Corinth, Mississippi) and consolidated unit designated as the 1st and 4th Consolidated Missouri Infantry Regiment
 Surrendered 9 April 1865 at Fort Blakely, Alabama
 Disbanded 10 May 1865 at Jackson, Mississippi
 Former 1st Missouri Infantry Regiment reconstituted in 1869 in the Missouri Militia at St. Louis as the 1st Regiment
 Disbanded 21 April 1874. (Missouri Militia redesignated 16 March 1877 as the Missouri National Guard)
 Reconstituted 16 August 1879 in the Missouri National Guard; concurrently, consolidated with the St. Louis National Guard Battalion (see ANNEX 1) and consolidated unit designated as the 1st Regiment
 Consolidated 27 June 1884 with the 3d Regiment (see ANNEX 2) and consolidated unit designated as the 1st Regiment
 Disbanded 23 May 1887 at St. Louis
 Reconstituted in 1887 in the Missouri National Guard as a battalion
 Expanded, reorganized, and redesignated, 8 October 1888 as the 1st Regiment
 Mustered into federal service 13 May 1898 at St. Louis as the 1st Missouri Volunteer Infantry;
 mustered out of federal service 31 October 1898 at St. Louis
 Disbanded 21 August 1899 at St. Louis
 Reconstituted 18 September 1899 in the Missouri National Guard at St. Louis as the 1st Infantry
 Mustered into federal service 18 June 1916 at St. Louis; mustered out of federal service 25 September 1916 at Nevada
 Called into federal service 25 March 1917 at St. Louis; drafted into federal service 5 August 1917
 Consolidated 1 October 1917 with the 5th Infantry, Missouri National Guard (organized 21 May 1917 at St. Louis) and consolidated unit designated as the 138th Infantry, an element of the 35th Division
 Demobilized 12 May 1919 at Fort Riley, Kansas
 Former 1st Infantry reorganized and federally recognized 14 April 1921 with headquarters at St. Louis (former 5th Infantry hereafter separate lineage)
 Reorganized and redesignated 1 October 1921 as the 138th Infantry and assigned to the 35th Division
 Inducted into federal service 23 December 1940 at St. Louis
 Relieved 1 March 1942 from assignment to the 35th Division
 Inactivated 20 July 1944 at Camp Shelby, Mississippi
 Assigned 20 June 1946 to the 35th Infantry Division
 Reorganized and federally recognized 22 October 1946 in the Missouri National Guard as the 138th Infantry with headquarters at St. Louis
 Reorganized and redesignated 15 April 1959 as the 138th Infantry, a parent regiment under the Combat Arms Regimental System, to consist of the 1st Battle Group, an element of the 35th Infantry Division
 Reorganized 1 April 1963 to consist of the 1st Battalion
 Converted, reorganized, and redesignated 1 May 1974 as the 1138th Engineer Battalion
 Consolidated 1 September 1993 with Headquarters and Headquarters Detachment, 880th Engineer Battalion (see ANNEX 3) and consolidated unit designated as Headquarters and Headquarters Detachment, 1138th Engineer Battalion
 Ordered into active federal service 15 March 2003 at St. Louis; released from active federal service 24 July 2004 and reverted to state control
 Converted, reorganized, and redesignated 1 September 2006 as the 135th Support Detachment; concurrently, location changed to St. Louis
 Ordered into active federal service 30 April 2008 at St. Louis; released from active federal service 8 May 2009 and reverted to state control
 Converted, reorganized, and redesignated 1 September 2010 as the 1st Battalion, 138th Infantry Regiment with headquarters at Kansas City

Annex 1
Organized 26 July 1852 in the Missouri Militia at St. Louis as the National Guards
 Expanded 28 July 1858 to form two companies
 Converted, reorganized, and redesignated in June 1860 as the Engineer Corps of Missouri
 Captured by Union forces 10 May 1861 at Camp Jackson, Missouri
 Reorganized 14 February 1872 at St. Louis as the Company of National Guards
 Mustered into state service 9 April 1878 as the St. Louis National Guard Battalion

Annex 2
Organized 7 November 1877 in the Missouri National Guard at St. Louis as the 1st Regiment of Police Reserves
 Mustered into state service 21 November 1881 as the 3d Regiment

Annex 3
Constituted 14 December 1942 in the Army of the United States as the 880th Airborne Engineer Battalion, Aviation
 Activated 1 March 1943 at Westover Field, Massachusetts
 Redesignated 24 March 1943 as the 880th Airborne Engineer Aviation Battalion
 Disbanded 21 December 1944 on New Guinea
 Reconstituted 6 March 1952 in the Air National Guard as the 880th Engineer Aviation Battalion, and allotted to Missouri, Louisiana, and Colorado
 Organized 1952–1954 with headquarters federally recognized 26 January 1954 at St. Louis, Missouri
(Federal recognition withdrawn 1 April 1954 from Company C [Colorado Air National Guard]; Company B [Louisiana Air National Guard] redesignated 1 September 1954 as Company B, 225th Engineer Aviation Battalion – hereafter separate lineage)
 Redesignated 15 January 1957 as the 880th Engineer Battalion and allotted to the Missouri Army National Guard
 Battalion broken up 15 January 1968 and its elements reorganized and redesignated as follows:
 Headquarters and Headquarters Company as Headquarters and Headquarters Detachment, 880th Engineer Battalion
 (Company A as the 1135th Military Police Company; Company B as the 202d Engineer Company; Company C as Company B, 110th Engineer Battalion – hereafter separate lineages)

Distinctive Unit Insignia

Description
A Gold color metal and enamel device 1 3/32 inches (2.78 cm) in height consisting of a shield blazoned:  Azure, the equestrian statue in profile of Louis IX (St. Louis) of France Or, (the statue is in forest Park, St. Louis, by Charles Henry Niehaus).

Symbolism
The shield is blue for Infantry.  The statue of Louis IX (St. Louis) alludes to the home area of the organization.

Background
The distinctive unit insignia was originally approved for the 138th Infantry Regiment on 24 May 1926.  It was redesignated for the 1138th Engineer Battalion on 3 May 1989.

Coat of arms

Blazon
 Shield- Azure, the equestrian statue in profile of Louis IX (St. Louis) of France Or, (the statue is in forest Park, St. Louis, by C.H. Niehaus).
 Crest- That for the regiments and separate battalions of the Missouri Army National Guard:  On a wreath of the colors Or and Azure, a grizzly bear rampant Proper. **Motto:   ST. LOUIS’ OWN.

Symbolism
 Shield- The shield is blue for Infantry.  The statue of Louis IX (St. Louis) alludes to the home area of the organization.
 Crest- The crest is that of the Missouri Army National Guard.

Background
The coat of arms was originally approved for the 138th Infantry Regiment on 8 July 1922.  It was amended to correct the blazon on 11 October 1923.  It was redesignated for 1138th Engineer Battalion on 3 May 1989.

Campaign streamers
Mexican War
 New Mexico 1847
 Chihuahua 1848
Civil War (Confederate Service)
 Shiloh 1862
 Mississippi 1862
 Louisiana 1863
 Mississippi River 1863
 Vicksburg 1863
 Alabama 1864
 Atlanta 1864
 Nashville 1864
 Alabama 1865
World War I
 Meuse-Argonne 1918
 Alsace 1918
 Lorraine 1918
World War II
 Aleutian Islands 1942/43
 New Guinea
War on Terrorism
 To be determined.

Decorations
 Meritorious Unit Commendation (Army), Streamer embroidered SOUTHWEST ASIA 2003-2004
 Meritorious Unit Commendation (Army), Streamer embroidered SOUTHWEST ASIA 2017

See also
 Apotheosis of St. Louis

References

External links
 official website 

138
Military units and formations in Missouri
138
Military units and formations established in 1832